Vidarrell Eugenio "Papito" Merencia (born 4 March 1994) is a Curaçaoan footballer who plays as a midfielder.

International
Merencia made his international debut on 14 November 2014 in an ABCS Tournament match against Aruba. He was then part of Curaçao's squad during 2014 Caribbean Cup qualification. He scored his first international goal during the qualification process, a game-tying 90th-minute strike against Martinique.

International goals
Scores and results list Curaçao's goal tally first.

References

External links
 
 Caribbean Football Database profile
 
 

1994 births
Living people
Curaçao footballers
Association football midfielders
Eredivisie players
ADO Den Haag players
Curaçao international footballers
2014 Caribbean Cup players
People from Willemstad